Dolní Roveň is a municipality and village in Pardubice District in the Pardubice Region of the Czech Republic. It has about 2,100 inhabitants.

Administrative parts
Villages of Horní Roveň, Litětiny and Komárov are administrative parts of Dolní Roveň.

Notable people
František Udržal (1866–1938), politician

References

External links

Villages in Pardubice District